The Voice of the Storm is a 1929 American silent drama film directed by Lynn Shores and starring Karl Dane, Martha Sleeper and Theodore von Eltz.

Cast
 Karl Dane as Spike 
 Martha Sleeper as Ruth 
 Hugh Allan as Tom Powers 
 Theodore von Eltz as Franklin Wells 
 Brandon Hurst as Dr. Isaacs 
 Warner Richmond as Dobbs 
 Lydia Yeamans Titus as Mrs. Parkin

References

Bibliography
 Munden, Kenneth White. The American Film Institute Catalog of Motion Pictures Produced in the United States, Part 1. University of California Press, 1997.

External links
 

1929 films
1929 drama films
1920s English-language films
American silent feature films
Silent American drama films
American black-and-white films
Films directed by Lynn Shores
Film Booking Offices of America films
1920s American films